Miller Wolf Oberman is a former Ruth Lilly Fellow as well as a 2016 winner of the 92nd St Y’s Boston Review/ Discovery Prize. His translation of selections from the “Old English Rune Poem” won Poetry’s John Frederick Nims Memorial Prize For Translation in 2013. Miller's first book "The Unstill Ones," a collection of poems and Old English translations was published in September 2017 by Princeton University Press. He lives in Brooklyn with his wife, rock singer Louisa Rachel Solomon of The Shondes, and holds a PhD in English from the University of Connecticut.

Awards 
Discovery/Boston Review Prize, 2016.

AWP Intro Award Journals Project, 2014 Honorable Mention for “Lies After the War.”

John Frederick Nims Memorial Prize for Translation, 2013, awarded by Poetry Magazine for the “Old English Rune Poem.”

The Wallace Stevens Student Poetry Prize, 2014.

Finalist for the Montreal International Poetry Prize, 2012.

Winner of a Dorothy Sargent Rosenberg Prize, 2009.

Winner of The Academy of American Poets University Prize, 2006.

Recipient of the Ruth Lilly Fellowship, 2005.

Recipient of the Flannery O'Connor Fellowship, 2004–2005.

Winner of the Sarah Lawrence College Andrea K. Willison Poetry Prize, 2000.

Selected publications 
Harvard Review: “From Old English Rune Poem,” “The Ruin,” “Caedmon’s Hymn,” “Riddle 63” and “Riddle 94,” forthcoming.

Southeast Review: “He Was Restless,” summer 2016.

The Minnesota Review: “Silentium” 2016.

Tin House: “Wulf and Eadwacer” and “Tension” Winter 2016/17.

The Nation: “Lies After the War,” forthcoming, 2016.

Broadsided Press: “Morning Pastoral,” forthcoming, 2016.

Boston Review: “Wolf Brother,” summer 2016.

Fourteen Hills: “The Smokewood Tree,” summer, 2016.

Poetry Magazine: translation of “The Woman Who Cannot,” July/August, 2016.

berfrois: “The Grave,” March, 2016, and “The Ruin” and “Dear Lengthening Day” June, 2016.

Beloit Poetry Journal: “Who People Are,” winter 2015-2016.

Poetry Daily: “Who People Are,” February 25, 2016.

Poetry Magazine: “On Trans,” March, 2015.

Poetry Magazine: translation from the “Old English Rune Poem,” June, 2013.

Rattle: “Ears” Summer, 2010.

Realpoetik: “Myron,” “To Keep the House Quiet,” “Eighth Nerve” and “Daybreak,” April, 2008.

The Minnesota Review: “Dixie Paint,” Winter, 2006.

Bloom Magazine: “After the Demolition Derby,” Fall, 2005.

References

Year of birth missing (living people)
Living people
American male poets
Poets from New York (state)
21st-century American poets
21st-century American male writers